Rodney James Alexander Wilson (born 1946 in Belfast) is a British economist and Emeritus Professor of Economics at Durham University. 
He is known for his expertise on Islamic economics. 
He is a recipient of Islamic Development Bank Prize in Islamic Banking and Finance.

References

External links
Rodney Wilson at Middle East Institute

Living people
British economists
1946 births
Academics of Durham University
Queen's University at Kingston alumni